Acanthogonatus vilches is a mygalomorph spider of Chile, named after its type locality: Gil de Vilches, Talca, Region VII (del Maule Region). Females differ from other species in the nahuelbuta group by their less modified spermathecae.

Description
Female: total length ; cephalothorax length , width ; cephalic region length , width ; fovea width ; medial ocular quadrangle length , width ; labium length , width ; sternum length , width . Its cephalic region is moderately convex, with a procurved fovea. Its labium possesses 1 cuspule. A serrula is present. Its sternal sigilla is small and oval, its sternum rebordered. Chelicerae: rastellum is weak, with long setae. Its book lung openings are wide and oval, more rounded than in other Acanthogonatus. Its cephalothorax and legs are yellowish brown, while its abdomen is mottled with a dark brown colour.

Distribution
Only in its type locality.

References

External links

ADW entry

Pycnothelidae
Spiders of South America
Spiders described in 1995
Endemic fauna of Chile